Football Club P.A.O.K. Thessaloniki Women's Football or with its official name FC PAOK Thessaloniki, represents the major Greek multi-sports club AC PAOK in the national A Division and international women's football competitions.

It was founded in 2001 as PAOK took over Olympiada'96 Thessaloniki, which faced economic problems. It is currently the leading women's football team in Greece, having represented the country in the UEFA Women's Champions League for the last seven years.

Current squad

Former players

  Kori Butterfield

Honours
 A Division (17) (record): 2002, 2006, 2007, 2008, 2009, 2010, 2011, 2012, 2013, 2015, 2016, 2017, 2018, 2019, 2020, 2021, 2022                                       
 Greek Women's Cup (6) (record): 2002, 2013, 2014, 2015, 2016, 2017
 Double (5) (record): 2002, 2013, 2015, 2016, 2017

UEFA Competitions Record

References

External links

Women's football in Greece
Association football clubs established in 2002
Women's football clubs in Greece
2002 establishments in Greece
PAOK